Euphaedra aberrans, the aberrant Themis forester, is a butterfly in the family Nymphalidae. It is found in Guinea, Sierra Leone and Ghana. The habitat consists of forests.

Similar species
Other members of themis species group q.v.

References

Butterflies described in 1891
aberrans
Butterflies of Africa